There have been five ships named HMS Snap in the Royal Navy:

 , a 16-gun brig-sloop, formerly the French brig Palinure, captured in 1808 and broken up in 1811. 
 , a 12-gun gun-brig launched in 1812, converted to a survey ship in 1823 and a powder hulk in 1827. Sold in 1832.
 , a transport, the former slaver Caicque, captured in 1847 and sold in 1848.
 , a wooden  launched in 1855, sold in 1868 to Japan and renamed Kaku Ten Kan.
 , an  launched in 1872 and sold in 1909.

See also

References

Royal Navy ship names